St Leonard's College is an independent co-educational school in Melbourne, Australia. Located in Brighton East, the school caters for students in all year levels from ELC for three-year-olds to Year 12.

Curriculum
St Leonard's was the first school in Victoria, and second in Australia, to offer the International Baccalaureate in addition to the more widely used Victorian Certificate of Education. The school is also authorised to offer the International Baccalaureate Primary Years Programme in the Junior School from ELC to Year 4. The ELC also uses the Reggio Emilia approach to learning.

Location

St Leonard's College is located in Brighton East, Melbourne, Australia. The school is in close proximity to Port Phillip Bay and 11 kilometres south east of the Central Business District.

Facilities

Facilities include a performing arts centre, systems engineering centre, theatre, visual arts centre, music centre, Junior, Years 5 and 6, Middle and Senior School buildings, Junior School STEM laboratory, two libraries, sports centre with indoor swimming pool, gymnasium, dance and aerobics studio, basketball and netball courts, playing fields and multipurpose sports courts.

Leonardian Centre 
The Leonardian Centre is a giant beehive-shaped theatre located in the centre of the school grounds. Opened in January 2021, the theatre features an auditorium (seating up to 600) with a half fly tower housing a curtain rigging system and lights, and an orchestra pit. Behind the theatre is located an agora with a large screen and an outdoor stage approximately 30 metres in diameter.

The theatre was designed with inspiration from the Globe Theatre, as its gabled roof resembled that of nearby Harefield House. The building was completed by ARM Architecture and, in 2021, received a commendation for educational architecture from the AIA 2021 Victorian Architecture Awards.

Previous events hosted at the Leonardian Centre include:

 March 2021: Grease
 April 2021: David Hobson - Live in Bayside
 May 2021: Victorian All-State Jazz Championships
 March-April 2022: Chicago - High School Edition
 August 2022: A Midsummer Night's Dream
 October 2022: Doctor Dolittle Jr.
 December 2022: The Wizard of Oz

Technology

St Leonard's College has a "bring your own device" (BYOD) technology program. Students in the middle years bring their own iPad to school every day while students in the senior years are able to bring any device of their choosing as long as it meets specifications.

While the BYOD program enables most students to complete all of their digital learning, the school also have computers where required. Students studying Information Technology, Media and Visual Design do so using the school owned computers and software.

Hart Theatre Company

In 2012, St Leonard's College launched the Hart Theatre Company, named after long-time drama teacher Roma Hart. The college hosts five productions a year: a year 5/6 musical, Middle School play, Middle School musical, Senior School play and Senior School musical. Recent productions have included The Wizard of Oz, Dr Dolittle Jr., A Midsummer Night's Dream, Chicago - High School Edition, and Grease.

Hart Theatre productions have received awards from the Music Theatre Guild of Victoria.  The 2012 production of Barnum was awarded Junior Production of the Year and Direction of a Junior Production.

In 2013 the Hart Theatre Company won Junior Production of the Year for a second year straight, this time for its production of Sweet Charity. The production was also awarded Junior Female Performer in a Leading Role. In the same year the Middle School production of Beauty and the Beast'' was awarded Junior Male Performer in a Supporting Role.

Music

The House Music Competition is an annual event for students in years 5 to 12. Held at The Plenary, each house presents two choir pieces, a small vocal piece and a small instrumental piece. Specialist judges from other schools are invited to select a winner in each category and overall.

Students from years 5 to 7 are required to learn an instrument. Private lessons are offered to students wishing to continue with their instrument onwards. Students can join ensembles, including orchestras (St Leonard's Symphony Orchestra and STL Pops), choirs (Middle and Senior School), bands (Symphonic Wind Ensemble, Wind Band, and Concert Band), and other specialist ensembles.

St Leonard's College offers VCE and IB music subjects. In this students are assessed on music performance and composition.

The St Leonard’s College Big Band achieved 1st place in the premier division of the Victorian All-State Jazz Championships in 2021 and 2022. 8 of the band members were awarded a place in the all-star band in 2022.

Sport
In years 5 and 6, St Leonard's students participate in the Coeducational Independent Primary Schools Sports Association competition, competing in a range of team sports against other coeducational independent primary schools. 

The college is part of the Association of Coeducational Schools (ACS) sports competition which involves other independent co-educational schools around Melbourne. Participation is mandatory in years 7-11, and optional for year 12 students. Students participate in a range of team sports, through the summer and winter seasons, as well as the carnival sports of cross country, swimming and athletics. 

St Leonard's College also has a community sport program, providing a number of opportunities for students, parents, staff and alumni to be involved in sport and fitness activities. Yoga, aerobics, gymnastics, adventure racing, surf ski paddling, cheer sports and triathlon are some of the activities available. There are also community basketball and netball clubs and a touch football group. 

In 2014 the sailing team won the Victorian Schools Team Sailing Championships for the seventh time, and also regularly competes at the National Championships.

The Hawkes Sports Centre has a large indoor pool, tennis courts, aerobics room, gym, multi-purpose hall and change rooms. The college also has outdoor hard courts and an oval.

ACS carnivals 

 Athletics (9) – 1998, 1999, 2000, 2001, 2002, 2014, 2018, 2019, 2022
 Cross-Country (11) – 1998, 1999, 2000, 2001, 2003, 2004, 2005, 2006, 2014, 2015, 2016
 Swimming (11) – 2000, 2005, 2006, 2015, 2016, 2017, 2018, 2019, 2020, 2021, 2022

ACS premierships 
St Leonard's has won the following ACS premierships:

Combined:

 Beach Volleyball (4) - 2014, 2015, 2016, 2019
 Touch Football (6) - 2013, 2014, 2015, 2016, 2017, 2021

Boys:

 Basketball (7) - 2001, 2004, 2009, 2014, 2015, 2016, 2021
 Cricket (3) - 2012, 2014, 2016
 Football - 2016
 Hockey (3) - 1998, 2020, 2021
 Soccer (3) - 2003, 2009, 2014
 Softball - 2020
 Tennis (2) - 2006, 2019
 Table Tennis - 2022

Girls:

 Basketball (3) - 2004, 2011, 2012
 Football - 2019
 Netball (11) - 2001, 2002, 2003, 2004, 2010, 2011, 2014, 2015, 2016, 2017, 2018
 Soccer (4) - 2004, 2013, 2019, 2020
 Softball (5) - 2002, 2003, 2004, 2005, 2019
 Tennis - 2015
 Volleyball (7) - 1998, 2000, 2001, 2002, 2004, 2020, 2021

Social responsibility

The St Leonard's College community is involved in a range of social justice activities. The College aims to support children and education in local, national and international settings.

Since 1992, St Leonard's College has been involved in Bangladesh, funding and building three schools. Each year, senior students organise a Bangladesh Dinner to raise funds for the ongoing operational expenses of these schools. The college also supports schools in Timor Leste and Nepal.

All year 9 students complete local service activities as part their experiential learning program – CUE (Community, Urban, Environment). The CUE program culminates in Big Experience trips, in which year 9 students take part in an international journey to a country in South East Asia, with the exception of 2022, when all trips were too Australia or New Zealand due to COVID-19. During 2020 and 2021, these trips did not occur. These trips have a strong emphasis on global sustainability and community service.

Outdoor education

Outdoor education is compulsory for students in years 3 to 10. Students attend year level camps at the college's dedicated campsite, Camp Ibis, located on the Gippsland Lakes where they take part in a range of adventure activities including sailing, mountain biking and canoeing.

There is also a voluntary Outdoor Education Extension Program. Students can elect to take part in adventure camps, white water rafting, adventure racing, snowsports (primary to year 12) and hikes (years 10 – 12). In 2012, 2013, 2014 and 2016 the St Leonard's College adventure racing team won the national Hillary Challenge, an interschool competition which tests basic outdoor skills and competencies.

Notable alumni
Kerry Armstrong – actor
Hamish Blake – comedian, radio presenter
 Kaarin Fairfax - actor, director and singer
Beverly Jane Fry – international ballet dancer
Noni Hazlehurst AO – actor
 Stephanie Hickey - Olympian, Australian snowboard slalom and snowboard cross competitor
Geoff Ogilvy – golfer, winner of the 2006 US Open
Ryan Shelton – comedian
Mark Turnbull – sailor, gold medal winner at the Sydney 2000 Olympic Games
Chris Judd - AFL player

See also
 List of schools in Victoria
 International Baccalaureate Diploma Programme

References

External links
St Leonard's College website

Educational institutions established in 1914
Junior School Heads Association of Australia Member Schools
Private schools in Melbourne
International Baccalaureate schools in Australia
1914 establishments in Australia
Buildings and structures in the City of Bayside